Francisco de Borja Sémper Pascual (born 10 January 1976) is a Spanish People's Party (PP) politician. He was a city councillor in the Basque cities of Irun (1995–2010) and San Sebastián (2019–2020) and a member of the Basque Parliament (2003–2020), serving as party spokesman in the latter chamber from 2013.

A member of the PP from the age of 17 and a target for violence by ETA, he left politics in January 2020 to work for Ernst & Young, but returned three years later to lead the PP's election campaigns.

Biography
Born in Irun, Gipuzkoa, Basque Country, Sémper joined the People's Party (PP) at the age of 17. He faced at least two assassination attempts from ETA due to his activism, one of which failed in 1997 because he missed his class at the University of the Basque Country, where he was studying for a law degree. In the New Generations of the People's Party, he formed a friendship with Santiago Abascal, who was voted the regional leader of the sector and later became president of Vox.

Sémper was voted onto his hometown's council in 1995. He resigned in January 2010, due to conflict with his regional and party political offices. He became a member of the Basque Parliament in November 2003, leader of the provincial PP in November 2009, and the party spokesman in the Basque Parliament in May 2013. 

Sémper was selected as the PP candidate for mayor of San Sebastián in December 2018, after 2015 candidate Miren Albistur decided not to run again. The party occupied three of 27 seats in the city council and faced competition on the right from the growth of Citizens and Vox. At the presentation of his campaign in February 2019, he made the unorthodox decision to not use any imagery or colours of his party. After the elections in May, he said that his unusual campaign paid off, as the PP had retained its seats in San Sebastián while making losses elsewhere in the Basque Country.

In January 2020, Sémper left politics for a position as director of institutional relations at Ernst & Young. He said that he could not cope with the confrontational nature of Spanish politics and wanted a new start for his family. He returned to the PP three years later, being hired by leader Alberto Núñez Feijóo to lead the campaign for the 2023 local and regional elections.

Personal life
As of February 2020, Sémper had two sons aged under five with actress Bárbara Goenaga, while each partner had two children from previous relationships.

References

1976 births
Living people
People from Irun
University of the Basque Country alumni
People's Party (Spain) politicians
Municipal councillors in the Basque Country (autonomous community)
Members of the 7th Basque Parliament
Members of the 8th Basque Parliament
Members of the 9th Basque Parliament
Members of the 10th Basque Parliament
Members of the 11th Basque Parliament
Ernst & Young people